The 2011 women's road cycling season was the first season for Skil Koga.

Roster

 
 
 
  (From 23/6)
  (Until 6/6)
  (From 1/8 as trainee)
 
 
 
  (From 12/6)
 
Source

Season victories

References

2011 UCI Women's Teams seasons
2011 in Dutch sport
2011